Verfrut Sur Airport was an airport serving the Verfrut, S.A. fruit orchards near Longavi, Maule, Chile.

The runway is currently used for material storage. Google Earth Historical Imagery shows numbers of storage containers increasing from (10/30/2006). Runway markings were removed sometime after (4/28/2007).

See also

Transport in Chile
List of airports in Chile

References

External links
OpenStreetMap - Verfrut Sur Airport

Defunct airports
Airports in Chile
Airports in Maule Region